Trifling with Honor is a 1923 American silent crime drama film directed by Harry A. Pollard and starring Rockliffe Fellowes and Fritzi Ridgeway. It was produced and distributed by Universal Pictures under their Jewel banner. It was also known as His Good Name from the short story source material by William Slavens McNutt.

Cast

Preservation
While Trifling with Honor is a lost film, a trailer for this film survives at the Library of Congress.

References

External links

1923 films
American silent feature films
Lost American films
Films directed by Harry A. Pollard
Universal Pictures films
Films based on short fiction
American black-and-white films
American crime drama films
1923 crime drama films
1923 lost films
Lost crime drama films
1920s American films
Silent American drama films